Domhnall MacNeachdainn was a 15th-century Dean and Bishop of Dunkeld.  He was the nephew of Robert de Cardeny, Bishop of Dunkeld, by Robert's sister, Mairead (Mariota). The latter was also the mistress of King Robert II of Scotland. His father was probably a chief of the MacNeachdainn (MacNaughton) kindred. Domhnall was university trained, and by 1431 had a M. A. and a Doctorate in Decrees. He had been Dean of Dunkeld since the year 1420. He was one of the commissioners of the Scottish king at the Council of Basel in 1433. In 1437, Bishop Robert de Cardeny died and Domhnall the Dean was elected as his replacement. Domhnall died sometime in the year 1440. Since Alexander Myln at least it has been thought that he sought confirmation from the Papacy and died en route, but direct evidence for this is lacking.

Notes

References
 Dowden, John, The Bishops of Scotland, ed. J. Maitland Thomson, (Glasgow, 1912)
 Myln, Alexander, Vitae Dunkeldensis ecclesiae episcoporum, ed. Thomas Thomson, rev. edn, 1, rev. Cosmo Innes, (Bannatyne Club, 1831)
 Watt, D. E. R., Fasti Ecclesiae Scoticanae Medii Aevi ad annum 1638, 2nd Draft, (St Andrews, 1969)

1440 deaths
Bishops of Dunkeld (non consecrated, titular or doubtful)
Medieval Gaels from Scotland
15th-century Scottish Roman Catholic bishops
Year of birth unknown